"Blue Bossa" is an instrumental jazz composition by Kenny Dorham. It was introduced on Joe Henderson's 1963 album Page One. A blend of hard bop and bossa nova, the tune was possibly influenced by Dorham's visit to the Rio de Janeiro Jazz Festival in 1961. The tune has since been recorded numerous times by different artists, making it a jazz standard.

See also
List of post-1950 jazz standards

Notes

External links

1963 compositions
Bossa nova jazz standards
Instrumentals
1960s jazz standards
Songs with music by Kenny Dorham
Hard bop jazz standards
Jazz compositions in C minor